Bradley Joseph Fitzpatrick (born February 5, 1980) is an American programmer. He is best known as the creator of LiveJournal and is the author of a variety of free software projects such as memcached, PubSubHubbub, OpenID, and Perkeep.

Early life and education
Born in Iowa, Fitzpatrick grew up in Beaverton, Oregon, and majored in computer science at the University of Washington in Seattle. He started his first company, FreeVote.com, while in high school.

Career
LiveJournal grew out of a journaling program Fitzpatrick wrote for himself as a college freshman. It eventually became a full-time job and then a company; in January 2005 he sold it and its parent company, Danga Interactive, to Six Apart, for an undisclosed sum of cash and stock. He was named chief architect of Six Apart. He left Six Apart in August 2007, moving to Google, and in 2008, after the sale of LiveJournal to SUP Media, joined the LiveJournal Advisory Board. In June 2010 the board was dissolved, ending his involvement with LiveJournal. At Google he was a Staff Software Engineer and was part of the Go programming language team.

In January 2020, Fitzpatrick announced he was leaving Google. Three days later he joined Tailscale as a late-stage co-founder.

Honors
In June 2014, the University of Washington School of Computer Science and Engineering gave Fitzpatrick an award for Early Career Achievement.

References

External links

1980 births
Living people
American male bloggers
American bloggers
Google employees
People from Beaverton, Oregon
University of Washington College of Engineering alumni
Web developers
Computer programmers
American computer programmers
People from Iowa
Livejournal